Leptomitales are an order of water moulds within the class Oomycetes that contains the genus Apodachlya.

References

Water moulds
Heterokont orders